Djangology is a compilation album by Django Reinhardt and Stephane Grappelli, released in 1961.

In 1949, Reinhardt and Grappelli reunited for a brief tour of Italy. While they were there, they recorded about 50 tunes with an Italian rhythm section, and although they did not know it at the time, these sessions would mark the last time the Gypsy guitarist and the French violinist recorded together.

This CD collects 23 of the best tracks from those final sessions, including versions of Hot Club standards like "Minor Swing", "Bricktop", and "Swing '42". Reinhardt died not long after he returned from Italy, so he and Grappelli were never able to continue their musical exploration.

Track listing 

 "I Saw Stars" (Al Goodhart, Al Hoffman, Maurice Sigler) – 3:30
 "After You've Gone" (Henry Creamer, Turner Layton) – 3:00
 "Heavy Artillery (Artillerie Lourde)" (Reinhardt) – 3:40
 "Beyond the Sea (La Mer)" (Jack Lawrence, Charles Trenet) – 4:16
 "Minor Swing" (Reinhardt, Grappelli) – 2:37
 "Menilmontant" (Trenet) – 3:03
 "Brick Top" (Reinhardt, Grappelli) – 3:44
 "Swing Guitars" (Reinhardt, Grappelli) – 2:54
 "All the Things You Are" (Oscar Hammerstein II, Jerome Kern) – 2:54
 "Daphné" (Reinhardt, Grappelli) – 2:26
 "It's Only a Paper Moon" (Harold Arlen, E. Y. Harburg, Billy Rose) – 2:51
 "Improvisation on Pathétique (Andante)" (Tchaikovsky) – 3:44
 "The World Is Waiting for the Sunrise" (Gene Lockhart, Ernest Seitz) – 2:52
 "Djangology" (Reinhardt, Grappelli) – 2:46
 "Où Es-Tu, Mon Amour? (Where Are You, My Love?)" (Stern, Stern) – 3:22
 "Marie" (Irving Berlin) – 2:54
 "I Surrender, Dear" (Harry Barris, Gordon Clifford) – 3:45
 "Hallelujah" (Grey, Public Domain, Robin) – 3:09
 "Swing '42" (Reinhardt, Reisner) – 2:26
 "I'll Never Be The Same" (Kahn, Malneck, Signorelli) – 4:02
 "Honeysuckle Rose" (Fats Waller, Andy Razaf) – 3:59
 "Lover Man" (Jimmie Davis, Roger Ramirez, James Sherman) – 3:11
 "I Got Rhythm" (George Gershwin, Ira Gershwin) – 2:44

Personnel 
 Django Reinhardt – guitar
 Stéphane Grappelli – violin
 Gianni Safred – piano
 Carlo Pecori – double bass
 Aurelio de Carolis – drums

Production
 Barry Feldman – reissue producer
 Joshua Sherman – series producer
 Seth Foster – engineer
 Ken Robertson – mastering
 Randi Alyssa Sherman – production coordination
 Frank Vignola – liner notes
 Don Gold – liner notes

References

Stéphane Grappelli albums
2005 compilation albums
Django Reinhardt albums
Bluebird Records compilation albums